The Leader of the House in Rajya Sabha is the leader and parliamentary chairperson of the majority party in the Rajya Sabha and is normally either a cabinet minister or another nominated minister. The Leader of the House is responsible for organising government meetings and business in the House. This office is not enshrined in the constitution and provided under the Rules of Rajya Sabha.

List of Leader of the House in the Rajya Sabha
The following individuals have held the office of the Leader of the House in the Rajya Sabha:

List of Deputy Leader of the House in Rajya Sabha
The following individuals have held the office of the Deputy Leader of the House in the Rajya Sabha

Piyush Vedprakash Goyal 
12 June 2019 – 13 July 2021

Mukhtar Abbas Naqvi
19 July 2021– 7 July 2022

Dharmendra Pradhan
01 October 2022 - Incumbent

See also
Vice President of India (Chairperson of the Rajya Sabha)
Deputy Chairperson of the Rajya Sabha
Leader of the House in Lok Sabha
Leader of the Opposition in Rajya Sabha
Leader of the Opposition in Lok Sabha
Secretary General of the Rajya Sabha

References

External links

 Leaders of the House

 
Lists of political office-holders in India